Myrto Uzuni (born 31 May 1995) is an Albanian professional footballer who plays as a winger for Spanish club Granada and the Albania national team.

Club career

Early career
Uzuni was born in Berat and moved to Zakynthos, Greece at the age of 10, along with his parents and two brothers. Having a passion for football, he joined the academies of a Zakynthos Club Association Doxa Pigadakia. At the same time, he helped his parents in a restaurant in Zakynthos where they worked. He remained there for seven years until 2012, when he returned to his hometown Berat. He joined his local side Tomori and began playing for the club's under-17 side, where he was the 2012–13 under-17 First Division top goalscorer with 14 goals. The following season he scored four times in his first four games, before joining the under-19 side for a football tournament in Spain in September 2013. Tomori won the tournament and Uzuni was the top goalscorer with seven goals, which led to a call up to the senior team by the head coach Madrid Muxhaj.

Tomori
He made his professional debut in an Albanian Cup fixture against Pogradeci on 24 October 2013, where he came on as a 53rd-minute substitute for Fatjon Lajthia in the goalless draw. He quickly became an important first team player for the under-19s, but he was once again called up to the senior team for the return leg of the Albanian Cup fixture against Pogradeci. Uzuni started the game and he quickly marked his first start with his first senior goal in the second minute, before adding a 71st-minute winner in the 3–2 win that saw his side progress to the next round of the cup. He soon made his league debut in the Kategoria e Parë against Veleçiku on 14 December 2013 in a 1–0 away win, where he came on at half time for Salvador Gjonaj. Overall, he made 11 league appearances and scored one goal to help his side finish in 4th place, as well as adding two goals in four Albanian Cup games in his debut professional season, taking his tally to three goals in 15 games.

Having established himself in the first team during the second half of the previous season under Madrid Muxhaj, the club saw a change of management as Eqerem Memushi took charge of the squad ahead of the 2014–15 campaign. The new head coach showed faith in the young player, by starting him in the opening game of the season in a 1–0 win against Shkumbini. He continued to remain in the first team with his good displays, and in December he scored twice in 11 days before the winter break. His performances throughout 2014 won him the Tomori Player of the Year award, which was given to the player shortly before he would go on to join top flight side Apolonia in the January transfer window of 2015.

Apolonia
In January 2015 Uzuni joined Kategoria Superiore side Apolonia by penning a four-year contract. He made his Kategoria Superiore debut soon after under coach Artan Mërgjyshi on 24 January against Tirana in a 2–0 away loss. He was considered an undisputed starter often completing full 90-minutes matches playing in front line among either Realdo Fili, Andi Ribaj and Marko Rajković. However Apolonia was shown very poor in scoring, remaining scoreless for first 5 games of the season's second-half losing in all cases, where Uzuni formed striking partnership along Fili and Ribaj with Rajković on the bench. Then they managed a 2–2 home draw against Kukësi on 28 February with a change of places in front-line between Ribaj and Rajković, resulting in Uzuni's first goal for Apolonia with Fili also scoring, both goals in the first-half. After this game, with trio Fili-Uzuni-Rajković as forwards, Apolonia went on to take 2 consecutive wins in which Uzuni helped Fili to score in both occasions. Following that Apolonia lost 3 next games scoreless versus 3 top table sides Laçi, Tirana and Partizani, later managing 3 other wins but losing often in the remaining matches, resulting in a relegation after ranking in the penultimate place –4 from Teuta.

Laçi
On 17 August 2017, after being a target of several top flight clubs, Uzuni completed a transfer to Laçi for €20,000. On the same day, he played and scored in a friendly against Iliria which ended 2–2. He made his competitive debut later on 10 September in 2017–18 Kategoria Superiore matchday 1 against Partizani, playing full-90 minutes as Laçi caused an upset by winning 2–0. He opened his scoring account on 21 October in the matchday 6 against Lushnja which finished in a 3–0 win with lifted Laçi in 3rd place in championship.

Later on 10 December, Uzuni scored his second of the season – the lone goal of the match versus Skënderbeu – to end the latter's undefeated streak in league. It was Laçi's first league win over Skënderbeu since April 2015. He scored his first top flight brace later on 14 March of the following year in the 3–1 win at Lushnja; he also hit the crossbar twice and had a goal canceled for offside. He has scored seven goals with three different teams at Roza Haxhiu Stadium, thus making his favourite stadium to score.

In the final matchday, Uzuni scored a brace in the 4–2 home win over Teuta which gave him ten for the campaign, as Laçi finished in 4th place to return to UEFA Europa League for the first time in three years.

In July 2018, Uzuni was included in manager Besnik Prenga squad list for the 2018–19 UEFA Europa League campaign. He made his debut in the competition on 12 July in the first leg of first qualifying round versus Anorthosis Famagusta. He played the entire match as Laçi lost 2–1. In the returning leg, he scored an 89th-minute header to give Laçi the 1–0 home win and progression to next round through away goal rule.

Uzuni's final match for the team occurred on 31 August 2018 in the 1–1 draw versus Skënderbeu where he scored the opener with a powerful shot inside the penalty area.

NK Lokomotiva
On 3 September 2018, Uzuni moved for the first time aboard and joined the Croatian club NK Lokomotiva by signing a four-year contract. Laçi reportedly earned €350,000 which Lokomotiva will pay in two installments. He took squad number 21, and made his competitive debut on 16 September in the 5–2 hammering of Slaven Belupo, setting up a goal. His maiden goal for the club came in his third league appearance, a 3–0 win at Gorica.

Ferencváros
On 7 August 2020, Uzuni joined Nemzeti Bajnokság I champions Ferencváros on a four-year deal for a reported fee of $1.98 million.

In Ferencváros's UEFA Champions League third qualifying round match against Dinamo Zagreb on 16 September, Uzuni scored an own goal to draw the sides level at 1–1 in the first half but then netted a 65th-minute winner to set up a two-legged play-off tie against Molde for entrance into the group stage.

On 29 September 2020, he was member of the Ferencváros team which qualified for the 2020–21 UEFA Champions League group stage after beating Molde on 3–3 aggregate (away goals) at the Groupama Aréna.

On 24 November 2020, Uzuni scored his first Champions League goal in a 2–1 away defeat against Juventus in the 2020–21 season. This goal ensured a record as the first one conceded by Juventus against a Hungarian side in European competitions.

On 20 April 2021, Ferencváros won the 2020–21 Nemzeti Bajnokság I season by beating archrival Újpest FC 3–0 at the Groupama Arena. The goals were scored by Uzuni (third and 77th minute) and Tokmac Nguen (30th minute).

Granada
On 31 January 2022, Uzuni moved to Spanish La Liga side Granada on a three-and-a-half-year contract. He made his La Liga debut soon after on 6 February playing as a starter against Real Madrid as Granada lost away 1–0. He established himself as a team starter playing often as a left winger. He scored his first La Liga goal in his 13th league game on 7 May 2022 against Mallorca in a 2–6 away hammering. Three days later he assisted Álex Collado's winning goal against Athletic Bilbao as Granada took an important victory in relegation battle. However Granada missed relegation battle only in the last day after a home goalless draw against Espanyol, raking in the 18th place out 20 teams of La Liga collecting 38 points, only 1 point behind 3 teams.

He remained with the club in the Segunda División making new league debut in the opening game of the season against Ibiza on 14 August 2022 playing the full 90-minutes as Granada took a 0–2 away victory. He managed to score first goal of the season a week later against Racing de Santander in the 90+1'minute to seal another 2–0 victory of his side. In the next week Uzuni scored his first hat-trick in Spain against Villarreal B to give Granada a 3–0 victory. On 14 October he became protagonist for Granada in a 5–0 victory over Sporting de Gijón in the 10th game week participating in 3 first goals by assisting a Antonio Puertas header in the 6th minute and scoring 2 subsequent goals by himself in the 27th and 50th minute, as with this win Granada got ranked in the second place only 3 points behind top table Las Palmas. On 23 October he renewed his contract until 2026. After 6 games scoreless he did a similar protagonism as previously against Sporting Gijon, this time against Deportivo Alavés on 2 December scoring twice and assisting once to overturn the score for Granada to 3–1. Subsequently he was switched to play as a center forward by coach Paco López, scoring 2 goals in two first occasions respectively against Burgos on 11 December and Cartagena on 8 January 2023 where each of goals served to give Granada's two identic victories 1–0. Then he scored a brace against Andorra to give Granada another clear victory with his only goals. Having scored several goals only in home matches, on 5 February 2023 he managed first away goal against Villareal B scoring in the 28th minute to seal a 0–2 victory for Granada which kept the team in competition for a direct promotion to La Liga. He succeded it with another brace a week later against Tenerife scoring in each half of the challenge as Granada took their 4th identical 2–0 win in row.

International career

Youth
After a good first-half season in the Albanian First Division with Tomori which resulted in a transfer to the Albanian Superliga at Apolonia, he was selected for the first time as international in a Albania under-21s squad only from Albanian Superliga by head coach Skënder Gega for a 3-days mini preparatory stage in Durrës, Albania from 22–25 February 2015.

He was then called up next month for the 2017 UEFA European Under-21 Championship qualification Group 4 opening match against Liechtenstein on 28 March 2015. He was given the number 10 shirt for his international debut and he started in attacking line along fellow Albanian Superliga Jurgen Vatnikaj supported by Liridon Latifi and Enis Gavazaj from wings as Albania U21 took a 0–2 away victory to get off to a winning start thanks to the goals of Rey Manaj and Liridon Latifi, where Uzuni himself managed to play the full 90 minutes and making an attemp to score a 3rd goal. Then following managerial switch with arrival of Redi Jupi and departure of Skënder Gega, during the championship Uzuni was relegated to the bench after tactics switch to 4-2-3-1 with Rey Manaj preferred as lone striker and also accompanied with arrival of Fiorin Durmishaj and strong competition in offensive line with quality talented midfielders such as Latifi, Endri Çekiçi, Milot Rashica, Gavazaj and Eros Grezda; thus despite being called up often, he was either on the bench or outside 18-man squad and managed to play only two other games, a last minute substitute versus Liechtenstein on 16 November and a full 90-minutes in the closing match against Israel in a 4–0 loss with his side already eliminated despite foughting continuosly and to be ranked in the mid-table collecting a record of 12 points, equalized with Hungary and –1 to Greece.

He scored his only youth international goal for under-21 on 20 May 2016 in a friendly against Czech Republic, netting his team's only goal in a 1–1 draw.

Senior
Uzuni received his first senior call-up on 2 October 2018 by manager Christian Panucci for the friendly against Jordan and the 2018–19 UEFA Nations League C third match against Israel. He made his senior debut against Jordan on 10 October replacing Eros Grezda at half-time to play along Rey Manaj in a match finished in a goalless draw. Later in the competitive match against Israel after 4 days, he played the full 90-minutes as a right winger but Albania lost 2–0.

Personal life
In December 2017, Uzuni unveiled that his inspiration is Portuguese striker Cristiano Ronaldo. On 24 November 2020 against Juventus, he scored for Ferencváros, copied his celebration, and swapped shirts with him.

Career statistics

Club

International

Scores and results list Albania's goal tally first, score column indicates score after each Uzuni goal.

Honours
Laçi
Albanian Cup runner-up: 2017–18
Albanian Supercup runner-up: 2018

Lokomotiva
Croatian Cup runner-up: 2019–20

Ferencváros
Nemzeti Bajnokság I: 2020–21, 2021–22
Magyar Kupa: 2021–22

References

External links
Myrto Uzuni at the Albanian Football Association

1995 births
Living people
Sportspeople from Berat
Association football wingers
Albanian footballers
Albanian emigrants to Greece
Albania international footballers
Albania under-21 international footballers
FK Tomori Berat players
KF Apolonia Fier players
KF Laçi players
NK Lokomotiva Zagreb players
Ferencvárosi TC footballers
Granada CF footballers
Kategoria Superiore players
Kategoria e Parë players
Croatian Football League players
Nemzeti Bajnokság I players
La Liga players
Segunda División players
Albanian expatriate footballers
Expatriate footballers in Croatia
Expatriate footballers in Hungary
Expatriate footballers in Spain
Albanian expatriate sportspeople in Croatia
Albanian expatriate sportspeople in Hungary
Albanian expatriate sportspeople in Spain